The men's triple jump event at the 2021 European Athletics Indoor Championships was held on 5 March at 10:11 (qualification) and 7 March at 10:53 (final) local time.

Medalists

Records

Results

Qualification
Qualification: Qualifying performance 16.80 (Q) or at least 8 best performers (q) advance to the Final.

Final

References

2021 European Athletics Indoor Championships
Triple jump at the European Athletics Indoor Championships